East China Township is a charter township of St. Clair County in the U.S. state of Michigan.  The population was 3,788 at the 2010 Census.

History
The township was named after China Township, Michigan.

Geography

Communities
Hawthorne is an unincorporated community on Remer Road, east of River Road/M-29 (Elevation: 591 ft./180 m.)

Demographics
As of the census of 2000, there were 3,630 people, 1,467 households, and 1,007 families residing in the township. The racial makeup of the township was 98.57% White, 0.22% African American, 0.28% Native American, 0.19% Asian, 0.03% Pacific Islander, 0.06% from other races, and 0.66% from two or more races. Hispanic or Latino of any race were 0.52% of the population.

There were 1,467 households, out of which 25.8% had children under the age of 18 living with them, 59.4% were married couples living together, 6.1% had a female householder with no husband present, and 31.3% were non-families. 27.8% of all households were made up of individuals, and 15.3% had someone living alone who was 65 years of age or older.  The average household size was 2.38 and the average family size was 2.90.

In the township the population was spread out, with 20.5% under the age of 18, 6.8% from 18 to 24, 24.8% from 25 to 44, 27.9% from 45 to 64, and 20.0% who were 65 years of age or older.  The median age was 44 years. For every 100 females, there were 92.0 males.  For every 100 females age 18 and over, there were 88.8 males.

The median income for a household in the township was $51,652, and the median income for a family was $65,597. Males had a median income of $47,104 versus $30,625 for females. The per capita income for the township was $26,792.  About 2.2% of families and 4.6% of the population were below the poverty line, including 5.0% of those under age 18 and 7.7% of those age 65 or over.

Economy
East China Township is home to the St. Clair and Belle River Power Plants.

References

External links
East China Charter Township

Townships in St. Clair County, Michigan
Charter townships in Michigan
Michigan populated places on the St. Clair River